The CS 50 is a Canadian sailboat, that was designed by Germán Frers.

Production
The boat was built by CS Yachts in Canada, with one example completed in 1987. The design went out of production in 1988.

Design
The CS 50 is a recreational keelboat, built predominantly of fibreglass. It has a masthead sloop rig or can be optionally cutter rigged. It fits an internally-mounted spade-type rudder and a fixed fin keel, displaces  and carries  of lead ballast.

No shoal draft examples were built, but the builder advertised it as an option.

The boat is fitted with a Westerbeke W-70 diesel engine.

The boat has a PHRF racing average handicap of 84 with a high of 84 and low of 84.

See also
List of sailing boat types

References

Keelboats
1980s sailboat type designs
Sailing yachts
Sailboat type designs by Germán Frers
Sailboat types built by CS Yachts